Sarıyayla is a village in the Akçakoca District of Düzce Province in Turkey. Its population is 274 (2022).

References

Villages in Akçakoca District